The W. A. Mason House is an historic house at 87 Raymond Street in Cambridge, Massachusetts.  The -story wood-frame house was built in 1846 and extended to the rear in 1867, giving it a T shape.  Its massing is Italianate as are its decorative window hoods, but its corner pilasters give it a Greek Revival character.  The main entrance is accessed through a single-story porch occupying the front crook of the T. W. A. Mason, for whom it was built, was a city surveyor who was responsible for surveying and platting a significant amount of the city in the 19th century.

The house was listed on the National Register of Historic Places in 1983.

See also
National Register of Historic Places listings in Cambridge, Massachusetts

References

Houses completed in 1846
Houses on the National Register of Historic Places in Cambridge, Massachusetts